Hi-Riders is a 1978 action film written and directed by Greydon Clark.

Plot 

Mark and Lynn (Darby Hinton and Diana Peterson) are drawn into acts of hatred and revenge after trying to collect on a bet with a "Hi-Rider," a drag-racing car club known for "jacking up" the rears of their cars much higher than stock. When a local "hothead" challenges the club to a race, both drivers are killed in a spectacular explosion. The local boy's father vows revenge, and an action-filled chase through town ensues between the Hi-Riders and the local henchman.

Release
The film was released theatrically in the United States by Dimension Pictures in 1978.

The film was released on a double feature DVD with Clark's The Bad Bunch by VCI Home Entertainment in 2010.

References

External links

1978 films
1970s action thriller films
1970s English-language films
American auto racing films
American chase films
Films set in California
Films directed by Greydon Clark
American road movies
1970s road movies
1970s American films